Alexandra Nicole Richards (born July 28, 1986) is an American model, artist, and DJ in New York City. She is the daughter of Rolling Stones guitarist Keith Richards and model and actress Patti Hansen, and the sister of Theodora Richards.  

Her modeling portfolio includes images by Sante D'Orazio, Carter Smith, Annie Leibovitz, Craig McDean, Mario Testino, Bruce Weber, Patrick Demarchelier, Steven Meisel and Tony Kelly.  Richards' face has appeared in magazines including Vogue, British Glamour, American Glamour, Italian Glamour, Vanity Fair, ID magazine, Harper's Bazaar, Jane, Teen Vogue, and French Jalouse. In 2010, she appeared in the French edition of Playboy.

She participated in the "Fashion for Relief" show on September 16, 2005, in New York, a benefit for AmeriCares to support victims of Hurricane Katrina.

Richards attended Weston High School in Connecticut.

References

External links
 
 Alexandra Richards at the Internet Fashion Database

1986 births
Living people
American female models
People from Fairfield County, Connecticut
American people of English descent
American people of Welsh descent
American people of Norwegian descent
People from Weston, Connecticut
Keith Richards